Federación is a department of Entre Ríos Province (Argentina).

References 

Departments of Entre Ríos Province